Fergie or Fergy or Fergee is a short form of the names Fergus, Ferguson, and Fergusson.

It may refer to:

People

 Fergie (DJ) (Robert Ferguson, born 1979), Irish DJ and former radio presenter
 Fergie (singer) (born Stacy Ann Ferguson, 1975), American singer-songwriter and actress 
 Alex Ferguson (born 1941), Scottish former football manager
 Barry Ferguson (born 1978), Scottish football player
 Clive Fergie (1895–1960), the Australian rules footballer
 Darren Ferguson, Scottish football manager and former player, son of Alex Ferguson
 Dennis Frederiksen (1951–2014), American singer 
 Fergie Aitken (1896–1989), Scottish footballer
 Fergie McCormick (1939–2018), New Zealand former rugby union footballer
 Fergie MacDonald (born c. 1940s), Scottish ceilidh dance band leader
 Fergie Olver, Canadian game show host and sportscaster
 Fergie Reid (1849–1924), Australian trade unionist and politician
 Fergie Semple (1922–2003), British Army brigadier and Director SAS
 Fergie Sutherland (1931–2012), Irish horse trainer
 Fergus Suter (1857–1916), Scottish footballer, arguably the first recognised professional footballer
 Ferguson Jenkins (born 1942), Canadian former Major League Baseball pitcher
 Fergy Brown (1923–2013), Canadian politician
 Fergy Malone (1844–1905), American baseball player
 Forest K. Ferguson (1919–1954), American college multi-sport athlete
 Henry G. Ferguson (1882–1966), USGS geologist
 Sarah, Duchess of York (née Sarah Ferguson, 1959), nicknamed "Fergie", the former wife of Prince Andrew, Duke of York
 Subhash Gupte (1929–2002), Indian cricketer

Other uses
 The Fergies, the Australian band
 Jack Ferguson Award (the Fergie), Ontario Hockey League ice hockey award
 Fergie Ferguson Award (the Fergie), University of Florida sports award
 Ferguson TE20, an agricultural tractor commonly known as the "Little Grey Fergie"
 Precision Tech Fergy, an ultralight aircraft

See also

 
 
 
 Fergus (disambiguation)
 Ferguson (disambiguation)
 Fergusson (disambiguation)

Lists of people by nickname
Hypocorisms